The Preston Strike and Lune Street Riot, which took place in Preston, in Lancashire, England over 12 and 13 August 1842, were part of the 1842 General Strike or ‘Plug Plot Riots’. These strikes and disturbances were prompted by depression in 1841–1842 which resulted in wage cuts of over 25%. They were influenced by the Chartist movement and the government's rejection of the petition for ‘People's Charter of 1838’, signed by over 1 million people who demanded a more democratic political system.

Disputes spread throughout the North West of England from late July 1842. Workers in Manchester and Stockport struck on 10 August, Bolton on 11 August and in Preston a mass meeting was called for Friday 12th. The demands made at most of the strike meetings were for a return to 1840 wages and an acceptance of the Charter. One of the Chartist leaders was Preston handloom weaver Richard Marsden.

The Preston Strike
The strike began on Friday 12 August 1842, after a large meeting of around 3,000 cotton workers at Chadwick's Orchard – now the site of Preston's Covered Market. They pledged to "strike work until they had a fair days wages for that work, guaranteeing its continuance with the Charter." The Chartist newspaper The Northern Star reported that "Before night every cotton mill was turned out without resistance—all done chiefly by boys and girls".

The next day news spread that some mills had resumed work.  The remaining strikers met in Chadwick's Orchard on Saturday morning, as early as 6am and went to Messrs. Sledden's machine shop on North Road and compelled workers there to turn out, "after several windows were broken and a few slight wounds inflicted on both sides." They then started moving through Preston from factory to factory.

The Mayor Samuel Horrocks, officials and the police were called upon to deal with the unrest and protect property. They enlisted the help of soldiers stationed in the town from the 72nd Highlanders to help stop the riot.

Samuel Horrocks, Junior, Mayor of Preston, 1842
Samuel Horrocks was a member of the Horrocks family which had risen to prominence in Preston in the 1790s through the cotton trade. His uncle John and father Samuel Horrocks founded Horrockses which, by 1842, was Preston's largest cotton manufacturer. The family had become very wealthy and both John and Samuel Horrocks had served as Members of Parliament until their deaths in 1804 and 1842 respectively.

Accompanying the Mayor were two local magistrates and mill owners George Jacson and John Bairstow. The officials also included the Town Clerk of Preston Corporation, Richard Palmer. Leading the police forces were Captain Woodford of the County rural police and Superintendent Bannister of the Preston Borough force.

The final confrontation: Saturday 13 August

The strikers moved into the centre of town to Messrs Paley's Mill where they met Preston officials accompanied by about 30 soldiers from the 72nd Highlanders and members of the County and Borough police. Their final confrontation was on the bottom of Lune Street outside the Preston Corn Exchange. Members of the crowd including men, women and boys gathered stones from near the canal and began throwing them at the police and military.

Reading of the Riot Act
The Mayor Samuel Horrocks read the Riot Act. 
This gave local authorities the right to use force if necessary to disperse unlawful assemblies and stop riots. When the violence escalated and the crowd did not disperse the military then fired, shooting at least eight men. The rioters then fled in shock and the injured men were taken to the House of Recovery.

Accounts vary as to who exactly gave the order and how shots were fired, but, at the later trial of chartist leader Feargus O’Connor, the police officer Mr Bannister stated that it was Samuel Horrocks who had given the order, but that he had not heard the order himself. Whatever the case, public discontent for the shooting was quickly directed at the Mayor Samuel Horrocks.

Killed and injured
The four men who died were:

John Mercer, aged 27 of Ribbleton Lane, a handloom weaver. Mercer had a ball shot through his right arm, through his fifth rib and through his chest and out of the left side of the spine.
William Lancaster, aged 25 of Blackburn. He was wounded by a musket ball entering his chest and passing under the fourth rib on the left side.
George Sowerbutts, aged 19 of Chandler Street, a weaver at Gardner's Mill. He died from his injuries on Sunday evening.
Bernard McNamara, aged 17 of Birk Street, a cotton stripper employed at Oxendale's Mill, was shot through the right side of the belly, from which the bowels protruded to a great extent. He died on Monday afternoon at about 1.30pm.

Those injured included:

William Pilling aged 21, a steam loom operator, who was struck by a bullet in the knee and taken to the Dispensary on Fishergate were his leg was amputated.
James Roberts, aged 20, a steam loom operator, who was struck in the hand which as a result was amputated.
Bryan Hodgson a shoe maker from St Peter's Square, who was shot in the back and had a bullet lodged in his spine. Despite this he survived and lived until 1878.

Reaction to the shooting
Opinion was divided about the shooting. Some, including the Mayor, thought it was justified but regretted the loss of life. The Northern Star summed up the Chartist reaction to the shooting:
People could scarcely believe their senses. Riots had happened before in Preston but never before had the military been ordered to fire. Another attachment of the 7th Rifle Brigade, about 150 in number were marched into town, and the 72nd were marched out, no doubt to stem popular fury, it being the almost unanimous opinion that the Mayor ought to be tried for wilful murder.

Inquests into the deaths, by a local jury, were held in Preston at the county court where Richard Palmer acted as coroner. After hearing the evidence all four deaths were ruled to be "justified homicide". Twelve men were put on trial for their part in the disturbances and received prison sentences ranging from nine months to two years.

The 1842 Memorial

A permanent memorial in memory of the cotton workers was unveiled on Lune Street on 13 August 1992, the 150th anniversary of the shooting. The memorial was designed and produced by the British artist and sculptor Gordon Young. It was inspired by Goya's painting The Third of May 1808 picturing Spanish civilians being executed in 1808 for resisting Napoleon’s troops.

The memorial was funded and supported by the Preston Trades Union Council, Preston Labour History Group, Preston Borough Council, Lancashire County Council, the Art Department of Preston Polytechnic (now the University of Central Lancashire) and North West Arts.

It was hoped that the placing of the memorial in Preston would remind people now and in the future that "Never without sacrifice have gains been made towards justice and democracy".

The drinking establishment adjacent to the statues is named 1842 as of 2016 in reference to the date of the shooting.

The Preston Passion
The Lune Street shooting and the story of Mayor Samuel Horrocks inspired one of the Preston Passion dramas, "Preston 1842" , which was screened live on television as part of the 2012 Preston Passion event. The event was centred at Preston Bus Station and took place on 6 April 2012, as part of the 2012 Preston Guild.

Further reading
Leigh, J.S., (2007), Preston Cotton Martyrs: the millworkers who shocked a nation, Palatine Books.
Lewis, Brian, (2002) "The Middlemost and the Milltowns: Bourgeois Culture and Politics in    Early Industrial England", Stanford, Stanford University Press.
"The General Strike of 1842", Mick Jenkins, Lawrence and Wishart, 1980

References

https://blog.britishnewspaperarchive.co.uk/2021/08/17/new-titles-16-august-2021/

1842 in England
Chartism
Riots and civil disorder in England
History of Preston
1842 riots
19th century in Lancashire
August 1842 events
1840s in Lancashire